Nakhjirvan (also Romanized as Nakhjīrvān and Nakhjīrevān; also known as Nazīrwān) is a village in Baqerabad Rural District, in the Central District of Mahallat County, Markazi Province, Iran. At the 2006 census, its population was 842, in 240 families.

References 

Populated places in Mahallat County